Antheraea helferi is a moth of the family Saturniidae first described by Frederic Moore in 1858. It is found in the north-eastern Himalaya and Sundaland.

External links

Antheraea
Moths of Asia
Moths described in 1858